Hella is a slang term meaning "very". 

Hella may also refer to:

Places
 Hella, Burkina Faso
 Hella, Iceland
 Hella, Leikanger municipality, Sogn og Fjordane, Norway
 Helle, Sunnfjord (also spelled Hella), Naustdal municipality, Sogn og Fjordane, Norway

Other
 Hella (band), a United States math rock band
 Hella (company), a German manufacturer of automobile lighting equipment
 Hella (musician), keyboardist of Finnish band Lordi
 1370 Hella, an asteroid
 "Hella", a song by Ken Carson from Project X
 hella-, an unofficial SI prefix designating 1027; based on the slang term
 Hella, a vampire in Mikhail Bulgakov's novel The Master and Margarita
 A name used for ISO 4165 plugs/sockets for automotive auxiliary power
 A German given name for girls. See wikt:Hella#German.

See also 
 Hela (disambiguation)
 Hellas (disambiguation)
 Hello (disambiguation)